Lourdes Hernández González, known professionally as Russian Red, is a Spanish indie and folk singer-songwriter.

Known by many as the "Spanish Feist", in reference to the Canadian singer-songwriter who inspires her in many of her attitudes on the microphone, Hernández—who writes and sings all of her compositions in English—states that she sings in that language instinctively because she has always listened to music in English.

History 
Russian Red's project began when Hernández met Brian Hunt, a musician with an English father and Spanish mother, with whom she recorded a demo (which included tracks that remain unpublished like "Reason", "The Night of the Paper", and "Sadie") that reached more than 70,000 visits on her MySpace page by 2008.

The name Russian Red comes from the color of a lipstick that Hernández herself usually wears. When asked how she chose the name, Hernández stated: "I had a band without a name some time ago. Since then, I was haunted by an obsession: to find the ideal artistic name. One day, I fell in love with this colour that a girl was wearing. I pronounced its name, and now it is my pseudonym."

Hernández become well known in the Spanish indie arena, performing more than 60 shows during 2007 and taking part in the prestigious Primavera Sound, among other festivals.

2008: I Love Your Glasses 
The Spanish producer Fernando Vacas asked Hernández to record an album to be issued by his label Eureka. The album, her first, was called I Love Your Glasses and quickly became a success, leading El País columnist Alfonso Cardenal to deem Russian Red the "revelation of the year".

2011: Fuerteventura 

With the release of her first album I Love Your Glasses Russian Red became well-known and popular in Spain. In late 2010, Russian Red signed with Octubre, music label of Sony Music Spain. In May 2011, she released her second album Fuerteventura. At the same time, she toured in Asia including China, Taiwan, Hong Kong, and Korea. She also released a duet with Elvis Presley of his song "Love Me Tender" in the special Spanish edition of the album Viva Elvis. Fuerteventura was recorded in Glasgow, with producer Tony Doogan (Belle & Sebastian, David Byrne, Mogwai).

After the release of the album she began promoting it throughout Spain with presentations and concerts in major cities. In the summer of 2011 she started playing in the major festivals (Bilbao BBK Live, FIB, Arenal Sound, etc.) and opened in the Asian market with a first visit to Taiwan where she achieved more success than any previous Spanish artist.

In October 2011, it was announced that Russian Red was awarded with MTV award for best Spanish artist of the year. That same month the singer covered the Leonard Cohen song "So Long, Marianne" as a tribute to him.

After a short break in the Fuerteventura tour in December 2011, Russian Red was back on the road in January 2012 with a new concert format, accompanied by Hunt (who had not been seen since "I love your glasses") and Pablo Serrano. During the rest of the year, she also travel to Spain and other European countries (France, Sweden, Switzerland, Belgium, Britain, Portugal, Netherlands, etc.) and Asia (China, Japan, Taiwan and South Korea), in many of which the Fuerteventura album went on sale.

On May 2, 2012, Esperanza Aguirre, the President of the Community of Madrid, awarded her with the Medal of the Community of Madrid, in the Silver category, for her work and career. In 2012, Russian Red recorded the songs "A la luz del sol" and "Volaré" included in the Castilian Spanish version of the soundtrack of the Disney / Pixar film Brave.

In late summer of 2012 Pablo Serrano was replaced by Juan Diego "Juandi" Gosálvez and 3 (Hernández, Gosálvez and Hunt) continued with the Fuerteventura tour and combined it with a mini-tour of five concerts as a tribute to the Beatles. In these five performances, Alex Ferreira joined as bassist and singer in one of the songs. In December 2012 she finished the Fuerteventura tour , although in 2013 she performed some concerts in Latin America.

2013–present: Agent Cooper 
In January 2013, Hernández went to live in Los Angeles where she prepared and recorded her third studio album, Agent Cooper. Recorded and produced by Joe Chiccarelli at Sunset Studios, the album was mixed by Mark Needham and engineered by Emily Lazar.

Discography

Albums 
 I Love Your Glasses (2008)
 Fuerteventura (2011)
 Agent Cooper (2014)
 Karaoke (2017)

Singles 
 "They Don't Believe" (2008)
 "Cigarettes" (2008)
 "Perfect Time" (2008)
 "I Hate You But I Love You" (2011)
 "The Sun, The Trees" (2011)
 "Everyday Everynight" (2012)
 "My Love Is Gone" (2012)
 "Casper" (2014)
 "John Michael" (2014)
 "Michael P" (2014)

References

External links 

 

Living people
Spanish singer-songwriters
Women rock singers
Spanish folk musicians
Red, Russian
Year of birth missing (living people)
21st-century Spanish women singers
21st-century Spanish singers
MTV Europe Music Award winners
Date of birth missing (living people)
English-language singers from Spain